The big blue blanket was an air defense system devised by John Thach during World War II for protecting American warships from attack by Japanese kamikazes.

History and tactics
As the American island hopping campaign got closer to Japan, the Japanese military began to employ suicide operations more extensively. As Allied losses mounted, a system for countering incoming suicide aircraft was developed. 
 
Thach, serving on Admiral Halsey's and Admiral McCain's staff as air operations officer, developed a plan that called for the constant presence of the blue-painted Hellcats and Corsairs over the fleet at all hours. He recommended larger combat air patrols (CAP) stationed farther away from the carriers, a line of picket destroyers and destroyer escorts placed 50 or more miles from the main body of the fleet to provide earlier radar intercepts, and improved coordination between the fighter director officers on board the carriers. Thach also called for dawn-to-dusk fighter sweeps over Japanese airfields, and the use of delayed action fuses on bombs dropped on runways to make repairs more difficult, 

The system left the picket ships extremely vulnerable to kamikaze attacks, but it gave more protection to aircraft carriers and troopships. 

The system had an immediate effect. During its use  the Liberation of the Philippines, "Despite an unopposed dry landing, 'suicide boats' and two hundred kamikazes made Mindoro's D-plus days as costly as Anzio's. Only saturation flights (called the "Big Blue Blanket") over Luzon airfields by Halsey's Task Force Thirty-Eight secured Mindoro."

References

Aerial warfare tactics